Slicks Box, first release not with Rhymesayers Entertainment by Musab Saad, formerly Beyond, and now known as Sab the Artist. The 12-track recording was released by Hieroglyphics Imperium.  This release features several rock track samples, such as Toto's "Hold the Line" and Led Zeppelin's "Whole Lotta Love."

Track listing 

 "Night of Mirage" – 3:08
 "Ay-Ay (South Side Accent)" – 4:00
 "Please Do Not Assume" – 3:25
 "I Wont Die" – 4:09
 "I Aint Even in the Nba!" – 1:50
 "Hat and Shoes" – 5:03
 "U Talking to Me?!!" – 3:55
 "Baang!!!" – 4:14
 "Confessions of MN. Slicks" - 4:01
 "Family Ties" - 4:13
 "I Gots to Get Mine" – 3:57
 "Kool Aid (Gettoe Juice)" -5:33

References

External links 
 Sab The Artist - Official Website
 Rhymesayers - Label Site
 Hiero - Label Site

2007 albums
Hip hop albums by American artists